Shenyang Aircraft Design Institute (or 601 Institute) is a Chinese aircraft design institute of the Shenyang Aircraft Corporation, specializing in the design of military aircraft.

Products
 Shenyang J-5
 Shenyang J-6
 Shenyang J-8
 Variants of Shenyang J-11, such as J-11B
 Shenyang J-31

References

Aerospace companies of China
Companies with year of establishment missing
1961 establishments in China